Vladislav Vadimovich Ryabtsev (born 13 December 1987) is a Russian rower. Competing in quadruple sculls he won the European title in 2015 and placed eighth at the 2012 Summer Olympics. He was disqualified from competing at the 2016 Olympics in the quadruple sculls after his teammate Sergey Fedorovtsev failed a drug test in 2016, but subsequently allowed to compete in the Games when Russia was allowed to rearrange their eligible oarsmen into the one remaining crew.

References

External links
 

1987 births
Living people
Russian male rowers
Olympic rowers of Russia
Rowers at the 2012 Summer Olympics
Rowers at the 2016 Summer Olympics
European Rowing Championships medalists